Bridge House may refer to:

United Kingdom and Crown dependencies
 Bridge House Estates, the body responsible for the bridges over the Thames bordering the City of London
 Bridge House, a Grade I listed building built over Stock Ghyll in Ambleside, Westmorland
 Bridge House, Castletown, Isle of Man, a registered building in the Isle of Man and the former home of Quayle's Bank

United States

 Bridge House (Albany, Georgia), listed on the NRHP in Georgia
 Bridges House, a name for the New Hampshire Governor's Mansion in Concord
 Bridge Creek Cabin-Ranger Station, Stehekin, Washington, listed on the NRHP in Chelan County, Washington
 Bridge Creek Shelter, Stehekin, Washington, listed on the NRHP in Washington

Canada
William Alexander House (Bridge House), a Registered Heritage Structure in Bonavista Bay, Newfoundland and Labrador, and the oldest documented house in the province

Schools
 Bridge House School, Western Cape province, South Africa
 Bridge House College, Ikoyi, Lagos, Nigeria